Russians & Americans is the tenth studio album by Al Stewart released in 1984. The album featured many of the musicians from his short-lived backing band, Shot In The Dark, along with a number of studio musicians. The album was released on LP and then CD in both the United Kingdom and the United States. The US version deleted two tracks found on the UK version of the album and substituted two new tracks in their stead. In 1993, EMI (UK) released a compilation with tracks from both versions and three live tracks from "The Blue Album". The album was re-released on the Collector's Choice label in 2007, with all tracks from both issues.

The track "1-2-3" is a cover of the Len Barry hit from 1965. However, instead of the romantic lyrics put forth with the original, Stewart has altered them using the context of political overreach and how such victimises other nations and indigenous peoples. In fact, very few of the song's lines escape change excepting: "One, two, three, that's how elementary it's gonna be" and "...Like taking candy from a baby."

Known for his songs that use historical events as inspiration, Stewart instead focused on the very real tensions between the two superpowers of 1983.

Track listings

Original UK LP (released 1984 on RCA) and CD (released 1993 on EMI)
Side 1
"Lori, Don't Go Right Now" (Al Stewart, Peter White)
"Rumours of War" (Stewart, White)
"The Gypsy and the Rose" (Stewart)
"Accident on 3rd Street" (Stewart)

Side 2
"Strange Girl" (Stewart)
"Russians & Americans" (Stewart)
"Cafe Society" (Stewart)
"One, Two, Three (1, 2, 3)" (John Medora, David White, Leonard Borisoff)
"The Candidate" (Stewart)

Original US LP (released 1984 on Passport)
The US version of Russians & Americans replaces "Lori, Don't Go Right Now" and "The Gypsy and the Rose" with "The One that Got Away" and "Night Meeting".

Side 1
"The One that Got Away" (Stewart, White)
"Rumours of War"
"Night Meeting" (Stewart)
"Accident on 3rd Street"

Side 2
"Strange Girl"
"Russians & Americans"
"Cafe Society"
"One, Two, Three (1, 2, 3)"
"The Candidate"

1993 CD UK - EMI 0777 7 89664 25
This CD reissue contains all 11 tracks from both the US and UK versions of the album, plus three live tracks.

"The One that Got Away"
"Rumours of War"
"Night Meeting"
"Accident on the 3rd Street"
"Strange Girl"
"Russians & Americans"
"Cafe Society"
"One, Two, Three (1-2-3)"
"The Candidate"
"The Gypsy and the Rose"
"Lori, Don't Go Right Now"
"Valentina Way" 
"Year Of The Cat" 
"Pink Panther/Song On The Radio"

2007 CD reissue (released on Collector's Choice)
This CD reissue contains all 11 tracks from both the US and UK versions of the album, plus three bonus tracks.
"The One that Got Away"
"Rumours of War"
"Night Meeting"
"Accident on the 3rd Street"
"Strange Girl"
"Russians & Americans"EMI
"Cafe Society"
"One, Two, Three (1-2-3)"
"The Candidate"
"The Gypsy and the Rose"
"Lori, Don't Go Right Now"
"In Red Square"* (Stewart, White)
"How Does It Happen"* (Stewart)
"The World According to Garp"* (Stewart)

* Bonus Tracks

Personnel
 Al Stewart - vocals, acoustic guitar, electric guitar, keyboards
 Denny Carmassi - drums
 Steve Chapman - drums
 Lynn Davis - backing vocals
 Mike Fisher - percussion
 Mike Flicker - percussion
 Joyce Kennedy - backing vocals
 Phil Kenzie - saxophone
 Robin Lamble - bass, acoustic guitar, accordion
 Marcy Levy - backing vocals
 Marc "Caz" Macino - harmonica
 Charity McCrary - backing vocals
 Harry Stinson - drums
 Peter White - accordion, acoustic guitar, electric guitar, keyboards
 Adam Yurman - electric guitar
Len Barry- vocalist, songwriter, and record producer

Charts

References

External links
Alstewart.com

Al Stewart albums
1984 albums
RCA Records albums
EMI Records albums
Collectors' Choice Music albums
Albums produced by Mike Flicker
Passport Records albums